Michael J. Dolan (born 1884) was an Irish actor known for Scrooge (1951), Captain Horatio Hornblower (1951) and Saints and Sinners (1949). He died on 21 October 1954 in Dublin, Ireland at the age of 70.

He was a distinguished actor with the Abbey Theatre for many years where he appeared in many productions, and in December 1923 he took over management from Lennox Robinson. During that time he was stage manager, general manager and director. His career with the Abbey can be seen in the Abbey Theatre Archives

During his acting career he appeared in numerous plays by Irish playwright Teresa Deevy, all of these were Abbey Theatre productions, The King of Spain's Daughter (1936), Katie Roche which toured to the Arts Theatre Cambridge, England and Temporal Powers (1937), The King of Spain's Daughter (1939), Katie Roche  (1949), and Katie Roche (1953) this was played at the Queen's Theatre, Dublin pending the rebuilding and enlargement of the Abbey Theatre.

Playography
The King of Spain's Daughter - 1936
Katie Roche - 1937
Temporal Powers - 1937
The King of Spain's Daughter - 1939
Katie Roche - 1949
Katie Roche - 1953

Filmography

References

External links
Michael J.Dolan at the Abbey Theatre Dublin
Michael J.Dolan at the Teresa Deevy Archive

20th-century Irish male actors
1884 births
1954 deaths
Irish theatre directors
Irish theatre managers and producers
Irish male film actors
Irish male stage actors